Gabriel-Yvan Gagnon (born October 27, 1951) is a Quebec politician who served as the member for Saguenay in the Parti Québécois from 1994 until 2001

Biography
Gagnon earned a law degree from Université Laval in 1975 and was admitted to the bar in 1976. He worked as a private secretary to then Minister of Transport Lucien Lessard in the René Lévesque government and then served as the clerk and general counsel for the City of Baie-Comeau.

Political career
Gagnon ran in the riding of Saguenay in 1994 and won.  He served as a backbench supporter in the Parizeau government.

Gagnon was re-elected in 1998 and went on to serve as Parliamentary assistant to the minister responsible for the North Shore region in 1998 for the Lucien Bouchard government. He then became Parliamentary assistant to the Minister of the Environment serving in both the Bouchard and Bernard Landry governments until resigning on September 16, 2001, to become the industrial commissioner for the City of Baie-Comeau. Since 2008, he has worked as an air liaison for an airline.

Electoral record

Provincial

References 

1951 births
Living people
French Quebecers
Lawyers in Quebec
Parti Québécois MNAs
People from Côte-Nord
Université Laval alumni
20th-century Canadian politicians
21st-century Canadian politicians